Macrolepiota is a genus of white spored, gilled mushrooms of the family Agaricaceae. The best-known member is the parasol mushroom (M. procera). The widespread genus contains about 40 species.

Taxonomy
Macrolepiota was circumscribed by Rolf Singer in 1948, with Macrolepiota procera as the type species.

DNA studies have split this genus into three clades.  The macrolepiota clade includes M. procera, M. clelandii, M. dolichaula and closely related species. The macrosporae clade includes species such as M. mastoidea, M. konradii, and M. orientiexcoriata, while the volvatae clade includes M. velosa and M. eucharis.

Uses
Macrolepiota procera, the parasol mushroom, is a well-known and highly esteemed edible species in much of Europe.
Macrolepiota albuminosa is eaten in Chinese cuisine, where it is called jīzōng (鸡枞; literally "chicken fir tree").

Species
, Index Fungorum accepts 42 species of Macrolepiota:
Macrolepiota africana (R.Heim) Heinem. 1969 – Cameroon 
Macrolepiota albida Heinem. 1969 
Macrolepiota albuminosa (Berk.) Pegler 1972 
Macrolepiota ampliospora Sosin 1960 
Macrolepiota bonaerensis (Speg.) Singer 1951 – São Paulo 
Macrolepiota brasiliensis (Rick) Raithelh. 1988 
Macrolepiota brunnescens Vellinga 2003 
Macrolepiota campestris Lebedeva ex Samgina 1983 
Macrolepiota citrinascens Vasas 1990 
Macrolepiota clelandii Grgur. 1997 – Australasia
Macrolepiota colombiana Franco-Mol. 1999 
Macrolepiota crustosa  L.P. Shao & C.T. Xiang 1980 – China
Macrolepiota detersa Z.W.Ge, Zhu L.Yang & Vellinga 2010 – China
Macrolepiota dolichaula (Berk. & Broome) Pegler & R.W.Rayner 1969 
Macrolepiota eucharis Vellinga & Halling 2003 – Australia
Macrolepiota excoriata (Schaeff.) Wasser 1978 
Macrolepiota fornica Raithelh. 1988
Macrolepiota fuligineosquarrosa Malençon 1979 – Morocco
Macrolepiota fuliginosa (Barla) Bon 1977 – Great Britain
Macrolepiota gasteroidea T.Lebel 2011 – Australia
Macrolepiota gracilenta (Krombh.) Wasser 1978
Macrolepiota imbricata (Henn.) Pegler 1966 
Macrolepiota kerandi (Speg.) Singer 1951 
Macrolepiota konradii (Huijsman ex P.D.Orton) M.M.Moser 1967
Macrolepiota mallea (Berk.) Manjula 1983 
Macrolepiota mastoidea (Fr.) Singer 1951 – Europe, Australia 
Macrolepiota odorata Heinem. 1969
Macrolepiota orientiexcoriata Z.W.Ge, Zhu L.Yang & Vellinga 2010 – China
Macrolepiota permixta (Barla) Pacioni 1979 – Great Britain 
Macrolepiota phaeodisca Bellù 1984 – Spain
Macrolepiota procera  (Scop.) Singer 1948 – Europe
Macrolepiota prominens  (Sacc.) M.M.Moser 1967 
Macrolepiota psammophila Guinb. 1996
Macrolepiota pulchella de Meijer & Vellinga 2003 
Macrolepiota rubescens  (L.M.Dufour) Pázmány 1985 
Macrolepiota stercoraria  (Rick) Raithelh. 1988 
Macrolepiota subcitrophylla Z.W.Ge 2012 – China
Macrolepiota turbinata T.Lebel 2011 – Australia
Macrolepiota velosa Vellinga & Zhu L.Yang 2003 – China
Macrolepiota vinaceofibrillosa T.Lebel 2011 – Australia
Macrolepiota zeyheri  (Berk. & Singer) Heinem. 1962

See also
List of Agaricaceae genera
List of Agaricales genera

References

External links

Agaricaceae
Agaricales genera
Taxa named by Rolf Singer
Taxa described in 1948